Election Integrity Commission may refer to:

Election Assistance Commission, an independent agency of the United States government created by the Help America Vote Act of 2002
Presidential Advisory Commission on Election Integrity, a presidential commission created by President Donald Trump in 2017